Shiv Kumar Sarin is an Indian gastroenterologist, hepatologist, translational scientist, researcher and teacher.  He set up the Institute of Liver and Biliary Sciences. He is a recipient of the Shanti Swarup Bhatnagar Prize and the Padma Bhushan. He served as Chairman of the Board of Governors of Medical Council of India. He was the president of the Asian Pacific Association for the Study of the Liver and founder of Asian Pacific School of Hepatology.

Biography 
Shiv Kumar Sarin graduated from the S.M.S.Medical College, Jaipur, in 1974, obtained his MD in internal medicine in 1978 and specialized with in gastroenterology  from AIIMS, New Delhi in 1981. After serving as lecturer at AIIMS, he joined G B Pant hospital under the Delhi University, where he became the Professor and Head of Gastroenterology in 1997. He set up the Institute of Liver and Biliary Sciences. He also serves as an Adjunct faculty of Molecular Medicine at the Jawaharlal Nehru University, Delhi.

Career 

Sarin's research have helped describe two major liver diseases, Portal Biliopathy and Acute-on-Chronic Liver Failure. He has developed or significantly contributed to the development of several treatment protocols for liver diseases such as the band ligation to prevent variceal hemorrhage. He has worked on gastric varices, and their classification bears his name as Sarin's Classification of Gastric Varices. Seventeen major treatment protocols have been credited to him including five major Asian Pacific treatment guidelines in liver disease, and the model he proposed on "endotoxemia induced portal hypertension and liver disease" is reported to have been universally accepted. His work has assisted in the understanding of Chronic HBV Infection, liver cancer and the B and C variants of hepatitis. His studies on "acute-on-chronic liver failure" disease and its therapy using Granulocyte colony-stimulating factor (G-CSF), a glycoprotein, have been successful in clinical trials. He has also contributed in analyzing the mother-baby transmission of Hepatitis B and its pathogenesis.

Sarin is one of the initiators of the Hepatitis B vaccination program in India and one of the organizers of the "Yellow Ribbon campaign", an annual program started in 1998. It was under his chairmanship that the Medical Council of India introduced the Vision 2015 document which proposed guidelines for regularizing medical education in India. He has published eleven books on hepatology, a number of them are reference books on the subject and has contributed 69 chapters to medical texts published by others. He has written over 350 articles, published in peer-reviewed journals such as The New England Journal of Medicine, the Lancet and Annals of Internal Medicine. He is the founder editor of Hepatology International, a Springer publication, and has mentored 90 post-doctoral and 25 doctoral students.

Positions 
Sarin served as the chairman of the Board of Governors of the Medical Council of India, the body for medical education in India for the 2010–2011 term. He is a former president of the Indian Society of Gastroenterology, Indian National Association for the Study of the Liver (INASL) and the Asian Pacific Association for the Study of the Liver (APASL) and is the chairman of the steering committee of APASL. He has been the vice-chair of the International Association for Surgeons, Gastroenterologists and Oncologists (IASGO) and sat in the External Advisory Board of the Clinical Research Center of Yonsei University Severance Hospital. He is a member of the steering committees of Indo-German Science Centre for Infectious Diseases  (IG-SCID) and the World Digestive Health Day (WDHD) and is a board member of the Institute of Translational Hepatology, Beijing and Asian Pacific Digestive Week Federation (APDWF), Singapore. He is also a Collaborating Investigator of the APASL-ACLF Research Consortium, a forum of the experts on Acute-on-Chronic Liver Failure (ACLF) disease from the Asia Pacific region.

Awards and honors 

Sarin was awarded the Japanese Research Science Award in 1986 and the Hoechst Om Prakash Memorial Award in 1987. He received the Ranbaxy Research Science Award in Medical Sciences in 1994 followed by Shanti Swarup Bhatnagar Prize of the Council of Scientific and Industrial Research (CSIR), the highest Indian award in the science category in 1996. The Association of Physicians of India (API) awarded him the Gifted Teacher Award in 1999 and Amrut Mody Unichem Award of the Indian Council of Medical Research (ICMR) reached him in 2003. He received the TWAS Prize of The World Academy of Sciences in 2004, the Silver Jubilee Award of the Medical Council of India the same year and the FICCI Award of the Federation of Indian Chambers of Commerce and Industry in 2005. The Government of India included him in the Republic Day honours list for the civilian award of the Padma Bhushan in 2007, the same year as he received the Om Prakash Bhasin Award and he received the Mahaveer Award of the Bhagwan Mahaveer Foundation in 2008. He is also a recipient of the Dhanvantri Medical Award, IEDRA Rashtriya Samman Puraskar, Lifetime Achievement Award of the Government of Delhi, Malaysia Liver Foundation Award and Vashisht Chikitsa Ratan Award of the Delhi Medical Association.

Sarin, a 1988 Fogarty Fellow of the National Institutes of Health, had been elected as its Fellow by the National Academy of Sciences, India (NASI) the previous year. He is an elected fellow of several other science or medical academies such as the American College of Gastroenterology (2002), Indian National Science Academy (2004), Indian Academy of Sciences (2005), and National Academy of Medical Sciences (2005). He has delivered several award orations; Dr. Dharamveer Datta Memorial Award Oration and Dr. Kunti and Om Prakash Award Oration of the Indian Council of Medical Research (2004), Netaji Oration by the Association of Physicians of India (2003), Dr. V. R. Khanolkar Oration of the National Academy of Medical Sciences (2004) and Dr. Yellapragada Subba Row Memorial Award Oration of the Indian National Science Academy (2005) are some of the notable ones.

References

External links

Further reading 
 

Recipients of the Padma Bhushan in medicine
Recipients of the Shanti Swarup Bhatnagar Award in Medical Science
Fellows of The National Academy of Sciences, India
Fellows of the National Academy of Medical Sciences
Fellows of the Indian Academy of Sciences
Fellows of the Indian National Science Academy
1952 births
All India Institute of Medical Sciences, New Delhi alumni
University of Rajasthan alumni
Indian gastroenterologists
Indian hepatologists
Indian medical researchers
Indian medical academics
Indian medical writers
Indian medical administrators
Academic staff of the All India Institute of Medical Sciences, New Delhi
Academic staff of Delhi University
Academic staff of Jawaharlal Nehru University
Living people
20th-century Indian medical doctors
TWAS laureates